A signature song is the one song (or, in some cases, one of a few songs) that a popular and well-established recording artist or band is most closely identified with or best known for. This is generally differentiated from a one-hit wonder in that the artist usually has had success with other songs as well. A signature song may be a song that spearheads an artist's initial mainstream breakthrough, a song that revitalizes an artist's career, or a song that simply represents a high point in an artist's career. Often, a signature song will feature trademark characteristics of an artist and may encapsulate the artist's particular sound and style. Signature songs can be the result of spontaneous public identification, or a marketing tool developed by the music industry to promote artists, sell their recordings, and develop a fan base. Artists and bands with a signature song are generally expected to perform it at every concert appearance, often as an encore on concert tours, sometimes being the last song of the setlist.

Examples of signature songs for selected artists

See also 
Honorific nicknames in popular music
Subject (music)
Theme music
Trademark look

References

External links
Signature Song List for Rock, Pop, R&B, and Country with links to YouTube

Lists of songs